Hot Mama Vibes is the fifth studio album by Australian blues musician Ash Grunwald. It was released in June 2010, peaking at number 31 on the ARIA Charts.

With reference to the album name and title track, Grunwald said "It's not something I would have put out there in the past. I would have constrained myself; I wouldn't have felt comfortable [but] this is my fifth album so it was time to just launch in there, do whatever I feel like."

At the ARIA Music Awards of 2010, the album was nominated for ARIA Award for Best Blues and Roots Album.

The album's opening track, "Walking", was featured in the soundtrack for 2011's Limitless, starring Bradley Cooper.

Reception
Rich Thompson from SoulShine said "Hot Mama Vibes is a much rawer, more frantic outing than his past couple of albums, achieving that same sound of pulsating drum beats and searing guitar solos with a lot less polish."

Jason Strange from MusicFeeds said "Australia's funkiest blues man has turned it up with his new record Hot Mama Vibe. This album oozes cool, the riffs are huge and fuzzy, Ash's voice is deep and seductive and the songs are upbeat and catchy."

Track listing

Charts

Release history

References

2010 albums
Ash Grunwald albums